The Griffin Park Historic District is a U.S. historic district (designated as such on July 18, 1996) located in Orlando, Florida. The district is bounded by Avondale and South Division Avenues, Carter Street, and I-4. It contains 26 historic buildings.

References

External links

Neighborhoods in Orlando, Florida
History of Orlando, Florida
Historic districts on the National Register of Historic Places in Florida
National Register of Historic Places in Orange County, Florida
Historic American Buildings Survey in Florida